Jenny Willford is an American politician serving as a member of the Colorado House of Representatives for the 34th district. Elected in November 2022, she assumed office on January 9, 2023.

Education 
Willford earned a dual Bachelor of Arts degree in women/gender studies and international/global studies from the University of Wyoming in 2009 and a Master of Arts in human rights and political science from the University of Manchester.

Career 
Willford worked as a legislative associate at Siegel Public Affairs from 2012 to 2014 and as the executive director of Emerge Colorado from 2014 to 2017. Willford operated her own consulting firm from 2017 to 2019 and joined the Colorado Sierra Club as the organization's decarbonization program manager in 2019. She was elected to the Northglenn City Council in 2017 and also served as mayor pro tem. Willford was elected to the Colorado House of Representatives in November 2022.

References 

Living people
Colorado Democrats
Members of the Colorado House of Representatives
Women state legislators in Colorado
University of Wyoming alumni
Alumni of the University of Manchester
Year of birth missing (living people)